Lynchius is a genus of frogs in the family Strabomantidae. The name honours herpetologist John D. Lynch. The distribution of Lynchius is restricted to the Cordillera Oriental in southern Ecuador and Cordillera de Huancabamba in northern Peru.

Taxonomy
The genus is relatively new; it was split off from Phrynopus in 2008 in order to resolve the paraphyly of that genus. The sister taxon of Lynchius is Oreobates.

Description
Skin is smooth.

Species
The following species are recognised in the genus Lynchius:
 Lynchius flavomaculatus (Parker, 1938)
 Lynchius megacephalus Sánchez-Nivicela, Urgilés, Navarrete, Yánez-Muñoz, and Ron, 2019
 Lynchius nebulanastes (Cannatella, 1984)
 Lynchius oblitus Motta, Chaparro, Pombal, Guayasamin, De la Riva, and Padial, 2016
 Lynchius parkeri (Lynch, 1975)
 Lynchius simmonsi (Lynch, 1974)
 Lynchius tabaconas Motta, Chaparro, Pombal, Guayasamin, De la Riva, and Padial, 2016
 Lynchius waynehollomonae Venegas, García Ayachi, Ormeño, Bullard, Catenazzi, and Motta, 2021

References

 
Amphibians of South America
Amphibian genera
Taxa named by William Edward Duellman
Taxa named by Stephen Blair Hedges